Bangor or City of Bangor may refer to:

Places

Australia
 Bangor, New South Wales
 Bangor, Tasmania

Canada
 Bangor, Nova Scotia
 Bangor, Saskatchewan
 Bangor, Prince Edward Island

United Kingdom

Northern Ireland
 Bangor, County Down
Bangor railway station (Northern Ireland)
 Bangor (Northern Ireland Parliament constituency), Bangor's former constituency in the Parliament of Northern Ireland
 Bangor (Parliament of Ireland constituency), Bangor's former constituency in the Parliament of Ireland
 Bangor (civil parish)

Wales
 Bangor, Gwynedd
 Bangor railway station (Wales)
 Bangor-on-Dee ( or ), Wrexham
 Bangor Teifi, Ceredigion

United States
 Bangor, Alabama
 Bangor, California
 Bangor, Iowa
 Bangor, Maine
 Bangor Air National Guard Base
 Bangor International Airport
 Bangor, Michigan
 Bangor (Amtrak station)
 Bangor Township, Van Buren County, Michigan
 Bangor Township, Bay County, Michigan
 Bangor, New York
 Bangor, Pennsylvania
 Bangor Base, Washington
 Bangor, Wisconsin, a village
 Bangor (town), Wisconsin
 Bangor Township (disambiguation)

Elsewhere
 Bangor Erris, County Mayo, Ireland
 Bangor, Morbihan, Britanny, France

Arts, entertainment, and media
 Bangor Daily News, Bangor, Maine, US
 Bangor FM, County Down

Sports
 Bangor City F.C., a football club in Bangor, Gwynedd
 Bangor 1876 F.C., a football club in Bangor, Gwynedd
 Bangor F.C., a football club in Bangor, County Down
 Bangor RFC, rugby union team of Bangor, Gwynedd, Wales

Transportation
 Bangor and Aroostook Railroad, Maine, US
Bangor International Airport, Maine, US
Bangor railway station (Northern Ireland)
Bangor railway station (Wales)
Bangor station (Michigan), US
 , a Great Lakes shipwreck
 City of Bangor, a US airline with the ICAO code XBG; see Airline codes-C

Other uses
 Bangor Cathedral, Bangor, Gwynedd, Wales
 Bangor University, Bangor, Gwynedd, Wales
 Bishop of Bangor, Bangor, Gwynedd, Wales

See also
 Bagnor, a hamlet in England
 Banger (disambiguation)
 Bangor City Council, Gwynedd, Wales
 Bangor City Forest, Maine, US
 Bangor Mall, Maine, US
 Bangor Mountain, Gwynedd, Wales
 The Bangor Aye, an independent online news service for Gwynedd, Wales
 The Beatles in Bangor,  the 1967 attendance by the band The Beatles at a transcendental meditation seminar in Bangor, Wales